Santalaris is a small village located in the Famagusta District of Cyprus, north of Famagusta. The Turkish Cypriot inhabitants of the village were killed by EOKA-B during Maratha, Santalaris and Aloda massacre. Santalaris is under the de facto control of Northern Cyprus.

The village was recorded as early as the early 13th century in papal documents.

See also
Maratha, Cyprus

References

Communities in Famagusta District
Populated places in Gazimağusa District